Rocks, Pebbles and Sand is the 1980 album by jazz bass guitarist and multi-instrumentalist Stanley Clarke. This was the first recording where Stanley featured his tenor bass.

Track listing
All tracks composed by Stanley Clarke, except where indicated.
 "Danger Street" – 4:51
 "All Hell Broke Loose" – 5:03
 "Rocks, Pebbles and Sand" – 4:13
 "Underestimation" –3:43
 "You/Me Together" – 4:05
 "We Supply" (Stanley Clarke, Louis Johnson) – 4:21
 "The Story of a Man and a Woman - Part 1: She Thought I Was Stanley Clarke - Part 2: A Fool Again - Part 3: - I Nearly Went Crazy (Until I Realized What Had Occurred)" – 11:13

Personnel
 Stanley Clarke – bass, tenor bass, piccolo bass, guitar, keyboards, percussion, vocals
 Chick Corea – Moog synthesizer
 Steve Bach – keyboards
 Greg Phillinganes – keyboards
 Charles Johnson – guitar
 Louis Johnson – guitar, bass, vocals
 Victor Feldman – vibraphone
 Simon Phillips – percussion, drums
 John Robinson – drums on "We Supply"
 Dennis MacKay – percussion
 Valerie Johnson – vocals
 Josie James – vocals
 Marcy Levy – background vocals
 George Bohanon – trombone
 Lew McCreary – trombone
 David Duke – French horn
 Vincent DeRosa – French Horn
 Bill Reichenbach Jr. – horn
 Jerry Hey – horn

Strings
 Mari Botnick – violin
 Thomas Buffum – violin
 Bobby Dubow – violin
 Sid Page – violin
 Sheldon Sanov – violin
 Carol Shive – violin
 Lya Stern – violin
 Charles Veal – violin
 John Wittenberg – violin
 Denyse Buffum – viola
 Rollice Dale – cello
 Niles Oliver – cello
 Ron Strauss – cello

Production
 Robert Giusti – Illustration artwork
 Nancy Donald – Design
 Henry Diltz – Photography
 Greg Falken – Assistant engineer
 Bruce Jost – Assistant engineer
 Chris Haas – Assistant engineer (Legend)
 Chip Leech, Larry Reuben – Assistant engineer (Mixing)
 Dennis MacKay – Engineer (Sound Production)

References

External links

1980 albums
Stanley Clarke albums
Epic Records albums
Jazz-funk albums
Albums produced by Stanley Clarke
Albums recorded at A&M Studios